The 1930–31 Prima Divisione was the third-level league of the 31st Italian football championship.

In 1928, FIGC had decided a reform of the league structure of Italian football. The top-level league was the National Division, composed by the two divisions of Serie A and Serie B. Under them, there were the local championship, the major one being the First Division, that in 1935 will take the name of Serie C. Starting from this season, the winners of the six groups of First Division would be admitted to the final rounds, where three tickets of promotion to Serie B were available, whereas the scheduled relegations were annulled by the Federation which expanded the division.

Teams 
The Northern section rose from 45 to 56 clubs including twelve teams from the disbanded lower inter-regional Authority. The Southern section rose from 15 to 24 clubs including quite all the provincial capitals under FIGC decision.

Regulation 
Four groups of 14 teams in the Northern section with two little final groups, thirty-two matchdays. Final group winners were promoted, ultimate and penultimate clubs in the regular season should be relegated.

Two groups of 12 teams in the Southern section with a Southern final.

Northern division

Girone A
Final classification

Results

Girone B
Final classification

Results

Girone C
Final classification

Results

Girone D
Final classification

Results

Final rounds
Girone A
Final classification

Results

Girone B
Final classification

Results

Comense and Vigevanesi promoted to 1931–32 Serie B.

Southern division

Girone E

Final classification

Results

Girone F
Final classification

Results

Final round

Final classification

Cagliari promoted to 1931–32 Serie B.

1930-1931
3
Italy